Ali Abdo may refer to:
 Ali Abdo (football chairman), Iranian boxer and founder of Persepolis F.C.
 Ali Abdo (wrestler), freestyle wrestler from Australia
 Ali Abdo (motorcyclist), Egyptian long-distance motorcycle rider